Stregheria is the root form of witchcraft originating in Southern Europe, but also includes Italian American witchcraft. The word stregheria is an archaic Italian word for "witchcraft", the most used and modern Italian word being stregoneria. "Stregoneria Italiana" is a form of stregoneria that took hold of southern Europe before the populace converted to Catholicism. Stregheria is rooted in folk magic having little if any relationship to other forms of witchcraft.

Author Raven Grimassi has written on the topic. Grimassi taught what he called the Aridian tradition from 1980.
He discusses elements of Italian witchcraft adopted by Gardnerian Wicca with ideas inspired by Charles G. Leland's Aradia, or the Gospel of the Witches (1899). The name "Aradia"  is due to Leland, who claimed that Erodiade (the Italian name of Herodias) was the object of a "witch-cult" in medieval Tuscany. Since 1998, Grimassi has been advocating what he calls the Arician tradition, described as an "initiate level" variant of the religion, involving an initiation ceremony. 

Author Paul Theroux has quoted Norman Lewis and Danilo Dolci by stating that the Sicilian strega is a useful, probably indispensable witch who "arranges marriages, concocts potions, dabbles a little in black magic, clears up skin conditions, and casts out devils."

While most practitioners consider Stregheria to be a distinct tradition from Wicca, some academics consider it to be a form of Wicca or an offshoot. Both have similar beliefs and practices. For example, Stregheria honors a pantheon centered on a Moon Goddess and a Horned God, similar to Wiccan views of divinity.

History
The modern movement originates in the 1970s with Italian-American Leo Martello.
Martello claimed to belong to a "family tradition" of religious witchcraft in his 1973 book Witchcraft: The Old Religion. Martello does not use the word "Stregheria" when referring to his personal practice, but refers to it as "the Strega tradition".

Raven Grimassi began teaching the "Aridian Tradition", a modernized public system presented in his published works, in 1980 in the San Diego, California area. Grimassi published two books related to the topic (Italian Witchcraft and Hereditary Witchcraft) between 1981 and 2009.

Revival of the name Stregheria first occurs in Grimassi's  Ways of the Strega (1994). In using an archaic Italian term, Grimassi follows Gerald Gardner (1954), who used the Old English form wicca to refer to the adherents of his alleged "witch cult".
The word is earlier found in a book titled Apologia della Congresso Notturno Delle Lamie by Girolamo Tartarotti (1751), who uses stregheria to describe Italian witchcraft as the cult of the goddess Diana. Although the validity of this view has been disputed by American scholars, Italian ethnohistorian Paolo Portone has demonstrated reference to the cult of Diana in the records of the earliest witch trials, including in the Canon Episcopi. 
Moreover, by contrasting the trials held before the Inquisitor of Milan in 1384 and 1390 of Sybil de Laria and Pierina de Bugatis, Portone has demonstrated how Inquisitors constructed beliefs surrounding "evil witches" directly from the Pagan worship of Diana.
Grimassi  founded the "Arician Tradition" in 1998, described as an initiate level variant of Stregheria.

Raven Grimassi
Raven Grimassi is the pen name of an Italian-American author, born in 1951 as the son of an Italian immigrant who was born and raised in the area of Naples, Italy. He became involved with a coven presenting itself as Gardnerian Wicca in 1969 in San Diego. He is the founder of the Aridian and Arician traditions of Italian-based witchcraft.  He stepped down as the directing elder of Arician Witchcraft in 2004.  Grimassi currently (as of 2009) lives in Massachusetts and is the directing elder of the Ash, Birch and Willow tradition, and co-director of the Fellowship of the Pentacle.  He was formerly co-director of the College of the Crossroads.

Grimassi is reportedly descended from an Italian witch named Calenda Tavani, who lived in Naples several generations ago. Grimassi states that his early training was a mixture of Italian witchcraft and folk magic.

His later interest in Neo-paganism began in 1969, and he was initiated into a system claiming to be Gardnerian Wicca in San Diego though the tradition's claim eventually proved to be false.  Ten years later, Grimassi began teaching the "Aridian Tradition", which he describes as a "modern system" of Italian Witchcraft or Stregheria, that he created for non-initiates. Grimassi also studied Kabbalah and other traditions of Wicca such as Brittic and the Pictish-Gaelic system in which he received third degree initiation in 1983 according to the Encyclopedia of Wicca & Witchcraft.  Grimassi also received third degree initiation into Traditionalist Celtic Wicca in 2001 at the First Wiccan Church of Escondido, California.

Views on a historical "religion of witchcraft"

Grimassi shares in common, in his books, the general "Witch-cult hypothesis" that appears in the writings of Charles G. Leland (Aradia, or the Gospel of the Witches, 1899), a theory to the effect that European witchcraft was the continuation of an ancient pre-Christian form.

Grimassi describes the roots of Stregheria as a syncretic offshoot of Etruscan religion that later blended with "Tuscan peasant religion", medieval Christian heresy, and veneration of saints.
  
Grimassi views Leland's book Aradia, or the Gospel of the Witches as a "Christianized and distorted version" of the original story of Aradia, whom he believes to be a mortal woman named Aradia di Toscano. However, Grimassi does endorse a number of elements from Leland's Aradia material, such as the inclusion of a full moon ritual and a sacred meal at the Tregenda, or Sabbat, along with the pantheon of a goddess and god figure.

Grimassi writes that Aradia di Toscano passed on a religion of witchcraft, based on ancient Etruscan paganism, to her followers (whom Grimassi calls "The Triad Clans"). The Triad Clans are referred to as "an alliance of three related Witch Clans known as the Tanarra, Janarra, and Fanarra".

Folklorist Sabina Magliocco points out that "Grimassi never claims to be reproducing exactly what was practiced by Italian immigrants to North America; he admits Italian-American immigrants "have adapted a few Wiccan elements into their ways".

Claims of family tradition
Reports that Grimassi claims to belong to a "family tradition" of religious witchcraft has attracted criticism. Grimassi responds by saying that, although he wrote about such a family tradition, he intentionally never specifically mentions his own family in his books, but that Llewellyn's marketing department designed text depicting him as being raised in a family tradition . Grimassi does not deny being the bearer of a family lineage but chooses to protect the privacy of his family by not mentioning or referencing specific members (hence his use of a pseudonym).

Sabina Magliocco, who has criticized some of Grimassi's claims, does point out that "Grimassi never claims to be reproducing exactly what was practiced by Italian immigrants to North America; he admits Italian-American immigrants "have adapted a few Wiccan elements into their ways".  After personally meeting Grimassi, Magliocco writes in her letter to the Pomegranate Reader's Forum:  
I had the pleasure of meeting Raven Grimassi during the summer of 2001, unfortunately after the final draft of my article had already been submitted to The Pom.  He was very gracious and helpful to me. From information he revealed during our interview, I can say with reasonable certainty that I believe him to have been initiated into a domestic tradition of folk magic and healing such as I describe in my article.

Practices
 
Grimassi's tradition centers around a duotheistic pair of deities that are regarded as divine lovers, and they may go by many different names, including: Uni and Tagni, Tana and Tanus, Diana and Dianus, Jana and Janus, and more. Practices include the celebration of seasonal holidays, ritual magic, strict adherence to performing their rituals skyclad for at least half of the year, and reverence for gods, ancestors and tradition-specific spirits. Stregheria itself has variant traditions, and individual practices may vary considerably.

In comparing Stregheria to Wicca, Grimassi notes both similarities between the two and differences.  He has defended his material as being significantly different from Wicca at the roots level, and asserts that many of the foundational concepts in Gerald Gardner's Wicca can be found earlier in works on Italian Witchcraft and ancient Mediterranean mystery sects. Nevertheless, some academics, such as Ethan Doyle White, consider Stregheria to be an offshoot of Wicca. Professor of anthropology and religion Sabina Magliocco has described Stregheria as "a religion similar to Wicca in structure and practice, with Italian flavor added through the names of deities, spirits, and sabbats."

Grimassi called his specific teachings on Stregheria the "Aridian Tradition" from 1980, after Aradia of Tuscany, an alleged messianic figure known as the "goddess of the witches", viewed within  the "Arician Tradition"  as a witch who revived the Old Religion. While the "Aridian" tradition was based on "self-dedication" alone, the "Arician" tradition involves a rite of initiation.

Some systems within Stregheria use a pentagram as an important symbol. The pentagram is often worn in the form of ring or necklace piece. Some traditions of Stregheria use the ritual tools of cup, wand, pentacle and blade, which are seen in the suits of occult or divinatory tarot cards and amongst many systems of Western occultism.  
Some Stregheria rituals take place in a circle, with an altar facing North. Ritual actions include prayer, and the blessing of food.

Some adherents of Stregheria celebrate the eight holidays of the neopagan Wheel of the Year, called "Treguendas", while others celebrate the Roman Catholic  or the ancient Roman holidays. One unified practice among Streghe is "ancestor reverence through spirits known as Lares".

See also
Witches of Benevento
European witchcraft
Neopaganism in Latin Europe
Neopaganism in the United States
Etruscan mythology
Stregoneria
Tages
Vegoia

Notes

References
Sabina Magliocco, "Italian American Stregheria and Wicca: Ethnic Ambivalence in American Neopaganism," in Modern Paganism in World Cultures: Comparative Perspectives, ed.  Michael Strmiska (Santa Barbara, CA: ABC-CLIO, 2006), 55–86.

External links
stregheria.com, Stregheria Italian Witchcraft homepage

Italian-American culture
Modern paganism in the United States
American witchcraft
Witchcraft in Italy
New religious movements
1970s in modern paganism